The Diablos Rojos del Mexico (English: Mexico Red Devils) are a professional baseball team in the Mexican League based in Mexico City, Mexico. The team was founded in 1940 by Salvador Lutteroth and Ernesto Carmona. The Diablos Rojos play their home games at Estadio Alfredo Harp Helú, which has a seating capacity of 20,233 people. They have won a league leading sixteen league championships, including back-to-back championships three times.

History

1940s

The Reds of Mexico, as they were known at first, were founded in 1940 by Salvador Lutteroth and the famous manager Ernesto Carmona. The Reds greatest rival was the best team in the league that season, the Blues of Veracruz. During the first two seasons, they remained one of the top teams, in second place, but after this and up until 1945, they fell far behind in the standings. In 1946 and 1947, they repeated as runners-up again. The last two campaigns of the decade passed unnoticed.

During the 1942 season, on April 23, the Reds were losing 13–7 in the ninth and final inning, until the Capital players began to fight back, scoring another 7 runs and beating their rivals, it was this moment Basilio 'Brujo' Rosell exclaimed that "these Reds play like devils," giving the team their nickname.

1950s
Mediocrity was a characteristic of the team during the first half of the decade. It was not until 1955 when El Mexico, as called by the media, would become a dominant team in the league, finishing behind only the Tigres Capitalinos and Tecolotes de Nuevo Laredo that season. It was also this year when Parque del Seguro Social (Social Security Park), with a capacity of 30,000, was opened, with an inaugural match between the Mexico Diablos and the Monterrey Sultanes, with an 18–14 victory for the Diablos.

The following season, 1956, the Diablos hired Cuban Lázaro Salazar as manager. With him, the red team finally got their first pennant, beating their crosstown nemesis, the Tigers Capitalinos, who finished second. After that, for the third time in their history, El Mexico finished as runner up in back to back years, 1957 and 1958.

1960s
The team was sold to a group of shareholders in the early 1960s. The 1963 team finished in second place. Under manager Tomás Herrera, the Diablos won their second league title by defeating the Tigers in the championship game in 1964. In 1966, the team had a great season finale, but could not defeat their bi-championship rival Tigers. The campaign of 1968 began with a preseason exhibition game against Major League Baseball's New York Yankees, who were defeated by Mexico. The team capped off the season by winning their third title over the Veracruz Red Eagles.

1970s
Beginning in the 1970 season, the Mexican League used the format of two zones, North and South, and the champion would be determined in a play-off. Mexico won the 1970 North title, but lost in the final series against the Red Eagles of Veracruz by 4 games to 2.

In 1972, the team was sold again, this time to a group led by Angel Vazquez. The team won on three of the four seasons between 1973 and 1976, defeating the Saraperos de Saltillo (1973) and the Vaqueros Unión Laguna (1974 and 1976) in the championship series. Cananea Reyes was the Reds' manager in 1974. In 1977, they could not repeat as champions and lost in the final series to Nuevo Laredo. In 1978 and 1979, the quality of the team's play declined so much that they failed to reach playoffs in 1979, something that had not happened since the creation of the league's playoff system.

1980s
The team was acquired by Chara and Roberto Mansur in 1980. The Diablos won their seventh pennant against the Reynosa Broncos in 1981. The team claimed the league championship again in 1985 against Nuevo Laredo, although the manager, Cananea Reyes, not could be with the team for several days due to poor health. In 1987 and 1988, the Reds won back-to-back championships. In 1987, with a star player Nelson Barrera, they defeated Nuevo Laredos in the final series. Their 1988 title came against Saltillo.

1990s
Reyes stepped down as manager following a cancer diagnosis, so Ramón Montoya took the responsibility to lead the Devils on tour in 1991. They made it to the finals, but lost to Monterrey in seven games. By 1992, the Devils, with Montoya as their manager, reached the playoffs again, but lost to the rival Tigers. In 1994, Mexico, with Marco Antonio Vazquez as manager, won the rematch, defeating Monterrey in game seven at Social Security Park to win their eleventh championship.

The next three seasons, with Vazquez as manager, were bitter in that the team managed to reach the finals, but lost every time. They were defeated by the Sultans in 1995 (4–0) and 1996 (4–1), and in 1997 by the Capitalinos Tigers in 5 games. In 1998, the Devils came back to the finals, but lost to the Guerreros de Oaxaca.

The 1999 season began with news that the Diablos would leave Social Security Park which was being demolished to build Delta Square, a modern shopping center. The team won the league championship in their final year at the stadium.

2000s
The Diablos and the Tigers moved to the Foro Sol stadium, a building designed primarily for major events like concerts, but also with a configuration for baseball. In the first year, the Diablos lost to the Tigers in five games. In 2001, they lost to the Tigers in six games. Things changed in the next two years. In the final series of 2002, the Tigers reached the fifth game with a 3–1 lead over Mexico. In the sixth game a home run ended up deciding the game for the Reds, forcing a final game seven, which was won by the Devils, giving them their 13th pennant under the leadership of Dominican Bernie Tatis. This title was dedicated to the memories of owner Chara Mansur and player Nelson Barrera who had died that season.

Mexico returned to the playoffs the next season, defeating the Tigers in five games. The title was dedicated to the memory of the beloved batboy who remained with the team for many years, Antonio 'El Abuelo' Mora. The 2004 and 2005 campaigns were difficult for the team, but they managed to qualify for the playoffs. In 2005, they celebrated their 65th anniversary, and decided to play only Mexican players. In 2008, they returned to fielding foreign-born players as well. In the 2006, the team won first place in the South, but were defeated by the Yucatán Lions in the seventh game of the first playoff series at home.

In the 2007 season, Mexico was again in first place in the Southern Zone, but were eliminated from the playoffs by Yucatán. Daniel Fernandez was appointed as manager in 2008. This season, Mexico was first in the South Zone. In the final playoff series, played against the Sultans of Monterrey, the Rojos won in five games. For the 2009 season, Daniel Fernandez continued managing and reached the playoffs, where they faced the Vaqueros Laguna. The Diablos managed to overcome the disadvantage in the series to force a seventh game, but they were eliminated.

2010s
Months before the start of the 2010 season Daniel Fernandez was relieved of command of the Puerto Rican team for the manager Max Oliveras "Mako". In celebration of the team's 70th anniversary, the Correos de México, the national postal service of Mexico, issued three stamps commemorating team players are: José Luis Sandoval, Miguel Ojeda, and Robert Saucedo. The National Lottery of Mexico issued tickets with team badge and image of a player. The 2010 team experienced problems with the pitching staff and several players were injured during the first half of the season. But for the second half the team managed to reach first place in the Northern Zone. During the first playoff round, they faced the Saraperos of Saltillo. The Rojos led the series, 3 games to 1, but after falling in the fifth game which was a no-hitter, the Coahuilans came from behind to win the series and eliminate Mexico.

In 2012, the Diablos Rojos faced Major League Baseball's Texas Rangers in an exhibition game at Rangers Ballpark in Arlington. The Rojos previously played an exhibition game against the Rangers in 1974 when they were managed by Billy Martin and the Reds were managed by Benjamin "Cananea" Reyes. Texas won the 1974 game.

Rivalries
The Diablos have a long-standing rivalry with the Tigres de Quintana Roo, who previously played in Mexico City but now play in Cancún. That rivalry was shown in the 2011 Serie del Rey.

Stadiums
In 2019, the Diablos moved into their new stadium, the Estadio Alfredo Harp Helú, located in the Magdalena Mixhuca Sports City. The club previously played in the Estadio Fray Nano, a 5,200-capacity ballpark in Mexico City, from 2015 to 2018. From 2000 to 2014, they played at Foro Sol, a sports and concert venue built in 1993 in the Autódromo Hermanos Rodríguez in eastern Mexico City. From 1940 to 1999, the Diablos played home games at Parque del Seguro Social.

Roster

Retired numbers

References

External links
  

Baseball teams in Mexico
Sports teams in Mexico City
Baseball teams established in 1940
Mexican League teams
1940 establishments in Mexico